In number theory, Dedekind function can refer to any of three functions, all introduced by Richard Dedekind

Dedekind eta function
Dedekind psi function
Dedekind zeta function